Gyeongju Seop clan is one of the Korean clans. Their Bon-gwan is in Gyeongju, North Gyeongsang Province. According to the research held in 2000, the number of Gyeongju Seop clan's member was 285. Their founder was  who worked as a Counsellor Remonstrant and Hanlin Academy in Song dynasty.  exiled himself to Goryeo expecting confliction and was settled in Damyang County located in Jeolla Province. A descendant of  founded Gyeongju Seop clan and made Damyang County Gyeongju Seop clan's Bon-gwan because Damyang County was the first place he was settled in.

See also 
 Korean clan names of foreign origin

References

External links 
 

 
Seop clans
Korean clan names of Chinese origin